USS Sea Gull  may refer to the following ships of the United States Navy:

 , a steamer acquired in 1822 and sold in 1840
 , a survey ship acquired in 1838 and lost in 1839
 , a patrol vessel in commission from 1917 to 1918
 , a patrol vessel in commission from 1917 to 1918

United States Navy ship names